Rose-Marie Carlsson (born 1954) is a Swedish politician from the Social Democrats who served as a Member of the Riksdag from 2008 to 2009. She returned to the Riksdag in the 2022 Swedish general election.

In the Riksdag, Hellberg served as a member of the housing committee in 1994–2002, and as a vice chairman of this committee in 2002–2006. He was also a deputy in the business committee (1995–1998) and the social insurance committee (1994–1995).

References 

Living people
1954 births
Members of the Riksdag from the Social Democrats
21st-century Swedish politicians
21st-century Swedish women politicians
Members of the Riksdag 2006–2010
Members of the Riksdag 2022–2026
Women members of the Riksdag
Women nurses
Swedish nurses